William Pendleton Thompson Hill (22 February 1895–6 December 1965) was a United States Marine Corps major general who served as Quartermaster General of the Marine Corps from 1944 to 1955.

Early life
Hill was born in Vinita, Oklahoma, and attended Kemper Military School. He later graduated from Western Military Academy in Alton, Illinois.  After his graduation from the University of Oklahoma, he entered active duty as a second lieutenant in the Marine Corps on 12 July 1917.

Military career
After attending flight school at the Naval Coastal Air Station in Cape May, New Jersey, Hill served as one of the Marine Corps' first aviators.  In 1918, he served as a pilot with the 1st Marine Aeronautic Company, flying seaplane patrols in the Azores.

In 1920, he was assigned as a member of the Naval Alaskan Coal Commission, where he served as a geologist during the survey of Alaskan coal fields.  As a captain, he commanded a company assigned to the American Legation in Peking, China.  While there, he participated in Doctor Roy Chapman Andrews' third expedition to the Gobi Desert in Mongolia, as the expedition topographer.

In 1933, he was posted overseas to Haiti, where he served as the quartermaster and paymaster director for the Garde d'Haiti.

During World War II, he was initially assigned as the liaison officer during the construction of Camp Lejeune, and briefly served as camp commander during 1941.  For his performance at Camp Lejeune, he was awarded the Navy Distinguished Service Medal.

In 1943, he was reassigned to Marine Corps headquarters for duty in the Quartermaster Department, becoming quartermaster general on 1 February 1944, a position he held until his retirement in 1955.  Victor Krulak, in First to Fight, described Hill as the "classic representative of the Quartermaster's tradition of fierce frugality....thrift was his watchword...

Decorations

Major General Hill's ribbon bar:

W.P.T. Hill Award
The W.P.T. Hill Award was established in 1985 to improve food service operation and recognize the best messes in the Marine 
Corps. Competitors are judged on areas such as operations, sanitation, taste and quality of food.

References

1895 births
1965 deaths
People from Vinita, Oklahoma
University of Oklahoma alumni
United States Marine Corps generals
United States Marine Corps Quartermaster Officers
United States Marine Corps World War II generals
United States Marine Corps personnel of World War I
Recipients of the Navy Distinguished Service Medal
Commanders of the Order of Orange-Nassau
Military personnel from Oklahoma